Falelima is a village on the southwest corner of Savai'i island in Samoa. The village is part of the electoral constituency (Faipule District) Alataua West which forms part of the larger political district of Vaisigano. The village's population is 412.

Mythology
In Samoan mythology, the village of Falelima is associated with a powerful spirit called Nifoloa.

The following is an explanation of the myth told in the words of Samoan historian Teo Tuvale (1855–1919) in the publication An Account of Samoan History up to 1918.

References

Populated places in Vaisigano